Utetheisa frosti is a moth in the family Erebidae. It was described by Louis Beethoven Prout in 1918. It is found on the Key Islands.

References

Moths described in 1918
frosti